Watlington is a suburb of Timaru, in the South Canterbury area and Canterbury region of New Zealand's South Island. It is located southwest of the town centre.

Talbot Park was an aged-care hospital-level facility in Watlington for over a century, until it closed in May 2021.

Demographics

Watlington had a population of 2,253 at the 2018 New Zealand census, a decrease of 45 people (-2.0%) since the 2013 census, and unchanged since the 2006 census. There were 909 households. There were 1,122 males and 1,134 females, giving a sex ratio of 0.99 males per female. The median age was 39.8 years (compared with 37.4 years nationally), with 438 people (19.4%) aged under 15 years, 432 (19.2%) aged 15 to 29, 999 (44.3%) aged 30 to 64, and 387 (17.2%) aged 65 or older.

Ethnicities were 90.0% European/Pākehā, 10.5% Māori, 2.4% Pacific peoples, 4.7% Asian, and 1.2% other ethnicities (totals add to more than 100% since people could identify with multiple ethnicities).

The proportion of people born overseas was 12.0%, compared with 27.1% nationally.

Although some people objected to giving their religion, 53.7% had no religion, 35.8% were Christian, 0.5% were Hindu, 0.8% were Muslim, 0.1% were Buddhist and 2.1% had other religions.

Of those at least 15 years old, 189 (10.4%) people had a bachelor or higher degree, and 477 (26.3%) people had no formal qualifications. The median income was $30,300, compared with $31,800 nationally. 186 people (10.2%) earned over $70,000 compared to 17.2% nationally. The employment status of those at least 15 was that 951 (52.4%) people were employed full-time, 273 (15.0%) were part-time, and 54 (3.0%) were unemployed.

Education
The site was formerly occupied by Watlington Intermediate, which opened in 1974 and closed in 2004.

References

Suburbs of Timaru
Populated places in Canterbury, New Zealand